New Zealand is scheduled to compete at the 2024 Summer Olympics in Paris from 26 July to 11 August 2024. It will be the country's twenty-fifth appearance as an independent nation at the Summer Olympics, marking its debut in Antwerp 1920 and competed at every Games since.

Competitors
The following is the list of number of competitors in the Games. Note that reserves in field hockey, football, and handball are not counted:

Equestrian

New Zealand entered a full squad of equestrian riders to the team eventing competition through a top-seven finish at the 2022 FEI Eventing World Championships in Pratoni del Vivaro, Italy.

Eventing

Rugby sevens

Summary

Women's tournament

The New Zealand women's national rugby sevens team qualified for the Olympics by securing a top four position in the 2022–23 World Rugby Women's Sevens Series.

Team roster
 Women's team event – 1 team of 12 players

Group play

Quarter-final

Semi-final

Gold medal match

References

Nations at the 2024 Summer Olympics
2024
2024 in New Zealand sport